The Queen's Silver Jubilee Cup is a set weights Group 1 Thoroughbred horse race in Hong Kong, run over 1400 metres, with the total purse of HK$10m in 2014/15, approximately US$1.3m. In the season of 2005/06, it was upgraded to Group 1 status and has since become the final leg of the Hong Kong Speed Series (formerly known as the Champion Sprint Series).

Winners since 2008

See also
 List of Hong Kong horse races

References
Racing Post:

 The Hong Kong Jockey Club official website of Queen's Silver Jubilee Cup(2011/12)
 Racing Information of Queen's Silver Jubilee Cup (2011/12)
 The Hong Kong Jockey Club 

Horse races in Hong Kong